"Faith in Me, Faith in You" is a song written by Trey Bruce and Dave Loggins, and recorded by American country music artist Doug Stone. It was released in February 1995 as the first single from his album of the same name, and reached No. 13 on the Billboard Hot Country Singles & Tracks chart in May 1995.

Music video
The music video was directed by Deaton-Flanigen Productions and premiered in early 1995.

Chart performance

References

1995 singles
1995 songs
Doug Stone songs
Columbia Records singles
Songs written by Trey Bruce
Songs written by Dave Loggins
Song recordings produced by James Stroud
Music videos directed by Deaton-Flanigen Productions